Alexander Bunyip's Billabong is an Australian television series for children which screened on the ABC from 1978 to 1988. It followed the adventures of Alexander Bunyip, a mythical Australian creature who first appeared in "The Monster..." book series and later the "Alexander Bunyip" book series.

Cast
 Ron Blanchard as Ron
 Jane Fennell as Jane
 Mike Meade as Alexander Bunyip

Alexander Bunyip
Alexander Bunyip first appeared in the book "The Monster That Ate Canberra", written and illustrated by Michael Salmon in 1972. This was followed up by "Son of the Monster" in 1973, "Travels with the Monster" in 1974 and "The Monster in Space" in 1975. The character later appeared in "Alexander Bunyip" and "Alexander Bunyip and the Swagman" both published in 1980.

The character appeared on television in various formats such as "The Alexander Bunyip Show", "Alexander's Afternoon", "Alexander's Antics" and "Alexander Bunyip's Billabong". The scripts for the television series were written by Mike Meade and Ron Blanchard.

See also
 List of Australian television series
 List of longest-running Australian television series

References

External links
 
 Footage of program on Youtube

Australian children's television series
Australian television shows featuring puppetry
Australian Broadcasting Corporation original programming
1978 Australian television series debuts
1988 Australian television series endings